Brighton High School, commonly abbreviated BHS, is a public high school located in Brighton, an incorporated town adjacent to the southeast border of Rochester, New York, United States. It offers a comprehensive curriculum for students in grades 9–12. It is part of the Brighton Central School District.

Academics

The class of 2015 graduated 296 students. There were eight National Merit Scholarship finalists, eight semi-finalists, and nine commended students.  For the class of 2015, about 89% of graduates chose to go onto high education, with the majority going to four-year colleges. Brighton regularly sends numerous graduates to top colleges and universities, including alumni currently at the University of Pennsylvania, Cornell University, Harvard University, Williams College, Princeton University, the University of Rochester, the University of Maryland, Stanford University, Georgetown University, and the Massachusetts Institute of Technology.

In 2015, Brighton offered Advanced Placement (AP) classes in numerous subjects, including Calculus (AB and BC), Biology, Physics (1, 2, and C), Chemistry, Environmental Science, Economics, Government and Politics, Psychology, United States History, European History, Statistics, Studio Art, English Literature, English Language, Spanish, French, German, and Computer Science. Of the 1094 AP exams administered to students, about 83% scored a 3 or higher.

Brighton offers a standard curriculum, including instruction in French, German, and Spanish.

Brighton also offers students extra help as needed, whether it is being in student help or Brighton Support Center. Brighton also offers an alternative instructional model (AIM) for those students needing smaller class sizes in a non-traditional setting.

The high school has an urban-suburban program that allows students from the City of Rochester to attend Brighton High School.

Performance

The school has appeared on Newsweek magazine's Top 100 Public High Schools list. In 1998, Brighton achieved its highest ranking on the Newsweek list, in 5th place. In 2004, it was ranked 27th in the nation. In 2006, it was placed 96th. In 2007, it was placed 79th, one ahead of Pittsford Mendon High School. In 2008, it was ranked 158, fifth among schools in the Rochester area behind Pittsford Sutherland, Pittsford Mendon, Greece Odyssey and Wilson Magnet. Rankings fluctuate heavily based upon AP exams administered relative to the graduating senior class. In 2010, Brighton was placed 126th.

In 2007, U.S. News & World Report magazine ranked Brighton High School 57th out of 18,790 public high schools. It was the only Monroe County school on the list.

Publications and productions
Brighton is one of the only schools in the Rochester area that allows its publications to hold permanent office spaces.
 Trapezoid is Brighton High School's monthly school newspaper. Sections include news, feature, opinion, in depth and sports. The newspaper has repeatedly received a number of awards, including first place in the Bertram Freed Memorial Award Competition, and New York's Best Newspaper and Best Online Publication from the Empire State School Press Association for several years in a row.
 Crossroads, Brighton High School's yearbook, was founded in 1933. It is distributed at BHS's annual Springfest.
 Galaxy, created in 1954, is Brighton's art and literary magazine. Galaxy continues its tradition of holding meetings at students' homes on Sunday evenings. Galaxy is entirely student-created, with the help of advisor and art teacher Debra Burger and is printed locally. In 2009, the magazine received a First Place with Special Merit award from the American Scholastic Press Association for its article on French sub ordinance. That same year, Jessy Randall (BHS class of 1988) published a young adult novel about Galaxy, The Wandora Unit. Galaxy received the Gold/All New York Award, as well as the Award for Originality from the annual ESSPA (Empire State Scholastic Press Association) Conference in 2011. Many individual Galaxy members won Gold awards in their respective fields at this conference as well.
 The Morning Show began in the 1986–1987 school year with Brighton Beat, a precursor to The Morning Show. This show included one news and one interview show each week. In 1991, The Morning Show was officially created at BHS by producers Bennett Killmer and Joe Nussbaum, with the help of a teacher, Richard Tschorke. Nussbaum went on to direct the short film George Lucas in Love and the feature films Sleepover and Sydney White starring Amanda Bynes. Tschorke was the advisor to the club for twenty years, later to be succeeded by Chris French as the new club advisor. The show originally only had a few small cameras. Since then, it has grown to include two Blackmagic Design studio cameras, a Behringer Audio Mixer, a graphics program from Datavideo called CG-500 and a Blackmagic Design ATEM 1 M/E Switcher. The show started streaming over the internet exclusively starting in the 2015-2016 school year. The Morning Show is regarded by some as a professional and quality program, and continues to modernize using more up-to-date equipment and resources each year.

Athletics
In 2011, the Brighton Barons (now Bruins) boys' soccer team won their third sectional title after defeating Aquinas in the Class A finals 2-0. They then defeated East Aurora of Buffalo 4-0 to win the Western New York Regional title, which gave them a place in the 2011 State Championship tournament in Middletown, New York. The Barons lost to Maine-Endwell in the semi-finals, where they lost in penalty kicks 4-5 after they tied 1-1 in regulation. They ended the season 13-4-4. The boys' soccer team won another title in 2012, when they defeated the eighth in the nation, and rival Pittsford Mendon, after Mendon swept them in regular season play. They beat Mendon 3-1. They lost in the Regional game to Williamsville East 2-0.

The girls' field hockey team in 2013 beat Pittsford Sutherland (2-0) for the sectional title. The team went to regional championship and won (2-0) against Amherst Central to advance to the Semi-Finals. The team then faced Burnt Hills-Ballston Lake; Brighton won (1-0). Brighton advanced to the finals where they lost to Lakeland (0-7).

The girls' Brighton (cross-country) ski team has held the Section V and state titles for four consecutive years, beginning in 2019.

Extracurricular activities
Many of Brighton's extracurricular teams have performed well in competitions:
Brighton Science Olympiad 
 The team was regional champion from 2010 to 2014.
 In the year 2014, Brighton medalled in every single event.
Brighton Math Team
 The team was Monroe County league champion for three years in a row.
Brighton Model UN
 Brighton won best delegation more than 3 years in a row. About 2/3 of all chairs and 3/4 of the Secretariat at the Hilton 2014 Conference as well as the 2015 UNAR conference were from Brighton High School.
Brighton FBLA 
Brighton Envirothon
 Brighton frequently placed multiple teams in the top 5 at the Monroe County Envirothon. In 2013, Brighton sent a team to the states competition, placing 8th.
Brighton Chess Team 
 The team was Rochester League 1 champion for over 3 years in a row, and won 2nd place at the 2013 playoffs.
 Brighton Speech and Debate Team
 In its first year, 2014, the Brighton team medaled in multiple categories.
 Four Public Forum debate teams represented Brighton in the 2016 New York State Forensic League State Tournament in Hofstra University in Long Island. The teams were given a proclamation from the Monroe County Legislature for their achievements. 
Brighton Masterminds
The team was named Rochester regional champion in 1995, 1997, 2005, 2014, 2015, and 2019.
In 2014 and 2015, the team placed second in the state championship meet.

Brighton offers other extracurriculars, including Mock Trial, Gender and Sexuality Alliance Club, Climate Club, Brighton On Board (a board game focused club), Friends of Rachel, and Bruins e-Sports Club. New clubs are formed every year, providing students a variety of activities to partake in.

Notable alumni

Ernie Clement (2014), baseball player 
Richard Ben Cramer (1967), Pulitzer Prize-winning journalist, author, and screenwriter
Tom Cross (1987), Academy Award-winning film editor
Winston Duke (2004), actor, appeared on Modern Family, Person of Interest, Marvel's Black Panther and 2018's Avengers: Infinity War
Tina Monshipour Foster (1993), lawyer and director of the International Justice Network, focusing on providing "free legal assistance to victims of torture, illegal imprisonment, and political and religious persecution."
Hank Greenwald (1953), sportscaster
Tom Hamburger (1970), journalist, among a group of journalists at The Washington Post credited with a Pulitzer Prize in 2018 for investigative reporting
Shirley Jackson (1934), author
Jess Klein (1991), singer-songwriter 
Jon Kolko (1996), designer and author
Hudson Leick (1987), actor
Josh Lewin (1986), sportscaster
Matt Medved (2004), editor-in-chief of Spin
Dennis Mepham (1976), professional soccer player that played in the NASL and the MISL
Jenna Mourey (2004), YouTube star and blogger
Joe Nussbaum (1991), film director 
Thomas Richards (1961), former mayor of Rochester, NY
William Scandling (1940), businessman who founded Saga Corporation, a food service company whose remnants are now part of Sodexo.
Arthur Schneider (1948) four-time Emmy Award winning television editor
Kristen Wiig (1991), actress and comedian, cast member of Saturday Night Live from 2005 to 2012, and an Academy Award and BAFTA nominee for Best Original Screenplay for her film Bridesmaids
Rodin Younessi (1986), professional race car driver
Ilya Kaminsky (1996), Ukrainian-American poet

References

External links

Brighton Central School District website
NY State Education Department - The New York State School Report Card for Brighton High School 2006
Famous Brighton High School alumni

High schools in Monroe County, New York
Public high schools in New York (state)
Buildings and structures in Brighton, Monroe County, New York